Periyakulam division is a revenue division in the Theni district of Tamil Nadu, India.

References 
 

Theni district